The Most Distinguished Order of the Crown of Terengganu (Bahasa Melayu: Darjah Kebesaran Mahkota Terengganu Yang Amat Mulia) is an honorific order of the Sultanate of Terengganu.

History 
It was founded by Sultan Ismail Nasiruddin of Terengganu on 19 June 1962.

Classes 
It is awarded in four classes: 
 Knight Grand Commander or Dato' Sri Paduka (Max. 25 recipients) - S.P.M.T.
 Knight Commander or Dato' Paduka (Max. 50 recipients) - D.P.M.T.
 Companion or Setia (Max. 100 recipients) - S.M.T.
 Member or Ahli (Max. 200 recipients) - A.M.T.

Recipients
 Ismail Nasiruddin of Terengganu, the 4th Yang di-Pertuan Agong of Malaysia and the 16th Sultan of Terengganu
 Abdul Razak Hussein, the 2nd Prime Minister of Malaysia
 Mahmud of Terengganu, the 17th Sultan of Terengganu
 Mizan Zainal Abidin of Terengganu, the 18th and current Sultan of Terengganu
 Wan Mokhtar Ahmad, the 11th Menteri Besar of Terengganu
 Ahmad Sarji Abdul Hamid, the 9th Chief Secretary to the Government of Malaysia
 Salleh Abas, former Lord President of the Supreme Court
 Mohamed Rahmat, former Minister of Communications and Multimedia (Malaysia)
 Ismail Omar, the ninth Inspector-General of Police (Malaysia)
 Raja Mohamed Affandi, former Chief of Army (Malaysia) and Chief of Defence Forces (Malaysia)
 Vincent Tan, the founder of Berjaya Corporation Berhad
 Azizulhasni Awang, the first and the only Malaysian cyclist to win two medal at the Summer Olympics. Cycling sports only, not the entire Malaysia history of Olympics achievement.

See also 
 Orders, decorations, and medals of the Malaysian states and federal territories#Terengganu
 List of post-nominal letters (Terengganu)

References 

 
Terengganu, Order of the Crown of
Crown